Polos generally refers to a high cylindrical crown typically worn by mythological goddesses.

Polos may also refer to:

 The plural of polo
 In music, the polos is one of the interlocking parts of Kotekan